Marcel Theux (born August 9, 1988) is a Swiss ski mountaineer and long-distance runner.

Theux was born in Orsières. He started ski mountaineering in 2002 and participated in his first race in 2003. Since 2007, he has been member of the Swiss national selection.

Selected results

Ski mountaineering 
 2010:
 2nd (espoirs), Trophée des Gastlosen (ISMF World Cup), together with Randy Michaud
 2011:
 2nd, World Championship, relay, together with Yannick Ecoeur, Martin Anthamatten and Marcel Marti
 7th, sprint
 8th, Trofeo Mezzalama, together with Didier Moret and Alexander Hug
 2012:
 1st, European Championship relay race, together with Martin Anthamatten, Yannick Ecoeur and Alan Tissières
 5th, European Championship, sprint

Running 
 2009:
 4th (juniors), Trail Verbier-St Bernard - "La Traversée", 52 km
 2010:
 2nd, Trail Verbier-St Bernard - "La Traversée", 61 km
 2011:
 2nd, Trail Verbier-St Bernard - "La Traversée", 61 km

External links 
 Marcel Theux, skimountaineering.org

References 

1988 births
Living people
Swiss male ski mountaineers
Swiss male long-distance runners
People from Entremont district
Swiss ultramarathon runners
Male ultramarathon runners
Sportspeople from Valais